Cairo Flats is a heritage-listed apartment building in the Melbourne inner city suburb of Fitzroy. The building was designed in 1935 by architect Acheson Best Overend and built in 1936.

It is a U-shaped, two story building comprising 28 apartments, mostly studio flats. Overend was influenced by modernist architect Wells Coates and the "minimum flat concept". Each apartment was designed to  "provide maximum amenity in minimum space for minimum rent". The building's cantilevered external concrete stairs was noted as an unusual innovation.

Further reading 
https://cairoflats.com.au/

https://thedesignfiles.net/2022/03/architecture-cairo-flats-fitzroy/

https://overland.org.au/2013/10/the-cairo-building-fitzroy/

http://architectuul.com/architecture/cairo-flats

https://www.lunchboxarchitect.com/featured/tiny-apartment/

https://assemblepapers.com.au/2012/06/18/the-cairo-romance-and-the-minimum-flat/

Cairo (novel)

References

Heritage-listed buildings in Melbourne
1936 establishments in Australia
Buildings and structures completed in 1936
Modernist architecture in Australia
Fitzroy, Victoria
Buildings and structures in the City of Yarra
Apartment buildings in Melbourne